David Roundy is a physicist known primarily as the author of the Darcs version control system.

His parents are Virginia (Giny) Miller Roundy & Willard (Bill) Roundy. He obtained a B.A. in Physics and Chemistry in 1995 and a Ph.D. in physics from Berkeley in 2001. Between 2001 and 2006 he did postdoctoral work at MIT and Cornell. He was an assistant professor in Physics at Oregon State University from 2006 to 2014, and an associate professor since 2014. His current research focus is on Condensed Matter Theory.

External links
 OSU Website
 

1973 births
Living people
Oregon State University faculty